On February 4, 1975 at 19:36 CST, an earthquake of  7.5 and intensity (MMI) IX hit the city of Haicheng, Liaoning, China. Much of the city was evacuated before the earthquake, so few died from building collapse, however, many died from fire and hypothermia in the subsequent days. The evacuees lived during the deep winter in self-made tents made of tree branches, bed sheets, tarps and straw, 372 froze to death and 6,578 suffered frostbite, while a fire burned 341 to death and 980 suffered non-fatal burns. The fire was one of the most notable earthquake-induced fires in China, triggered from a combination of cooking, winter heating and lighting. 

The early evacuation ordered by Chinese officials had been questioned to whether it was a scientific earthquake prediction or a fluke. The prediction was based mainly on the pronounced foreshock sequence. None of the precursors observed in this earthquake were observed in the 1976 Tangshan earthquake, which killed over 240,000. This prediction was later put under heavy scrutiny and was deemed a fluke.

Tectonic setting 
Leading up to the earthquake in 1975, there were multiple large earthquakes that occurred in three years all due to right-lateral motion of north northeast-trending strike-slip faults, they also appeared to have migrated from southwest to northeast. These were the three earthquakes of M 6.8, 6.7, and 7.2 in the Xingtai area in March 1966, the M 6.7 Hejian earthquake of 1967, and the M 7.4 Bohai Sea earthquake of 1969. These interpretations are believed to be tied into the Geomechanics Theory of Li Siguang. The theory states "that north-northeast China is part of an integral geological system characterized by neotectonic right-lateral motion along north-northeast trending structures", in other terms, this relates to the deformation of the Eurasian plate with a east–west compressive stress regime which was caused by continental collision at the Himalaya and plate subduction along the Japan–Kuril trenches. There is a belief among scientist that the early earthquakes in North China set off the large system and led to more earthquakes later on.

Evacuation 
A low-level alert was triggered by regional increases in seismicity (later recognized as foreshocks). Both authorities and citizens were finally placed on high alert and an evacuation order was issued due to an increase in foreshocks. Though this particular prediction of the earthquake was initially believed to be just the latest in a recent string of false alarms that had occurred in the preceding months, including one case of an earthquake swarm being caused by the filling of a reservoir, the evacuation of Haicheng proceeded anyway and eventually paid off.

The evacuation, despite successfully removing most of Haicheng's population, did not prevent deaths in its entirety. When the main quake struck at 7:36 pm, a reported 2,041 people died, over 27,000 were injured and thousands of buildings collapsed. However, the death toll was much lower than the estimate of over 150,000 dead which is believed to have resulted if the evacuation had not taken place. This was the only successful evacuation of a potentially affected population before a devastating earthquake in history.

Fatalities
Much of the city was evacuated before the earthquake, so few died from building collapse, however, many died from fire and hypothermia in the subsequent days. The evacuees lived during the deep winter in self-made tents made of tree branches, bed sheets, tarps and straw, 372 froze to death and 6,578 suffered frostbite, while a fire burned 341 to death and 980 suffered non-fatal burns. The fire was one of the most notable earthquake-induced fires in China, triggered from a combination of cooking, winter heating and lighting.

Damage 
The earthquake's close proximity to a city of one million residents caused a large amount of destruction to infrastructure and property. Haicheng was decimated by this earthquake as the intensity was too great for the buildings to withstand. There was mass building collapse throughout the area as well as the destruction of cultivated land, roads, highways, and railways. It is approximated that 90% of the structures in Haicheng at the time experienced significant damage or were completely destroyed by the earthquake. Local bridges collapsed and oil transport pipelines were damaged. Unfortunately, due to the political climate in China at the time, exact damage totals are unknown.

However, damage was reported as far away as South Korea and Japan. Due to the distance between these areas and the epicenter of the quake, the damage were significantly less in number and in degree. In Seoul, South Korea, the MMI was calculated to be a IV in comparison to Haicheng where the MMI was determined to be IX. In contrast to mass building collapse in Haicheng, there were a few reports of smaller buildings collapsing partially as well as intense shaking of high rise buildings. Interruption of electrical service was also reported due to transformer tripping that is attributed to long-period seismic waves from the high magnitude earthquake being able to travel far distances.

Earthquake prediction
The early evacuation ordered by Chinese officials had been questioned to whether it was a scientific earthquake prediction or a fluke. The Chinese traced their predictions to as early as 1970. A team of scientists from the U.S. visited laboratories in China in 1976 to investigate the Haicheng prediction. Their report concluded that the 1975 Haicheng prediction was based mainly on the pronounced foreshock sequence. Due to these foreshocks, some of the final evacuation orders were given only hours before the destructive earthquake preventing further loss of life. This "prediction" was later put under heavy scrutiny and was deemed as a fluke.

This prediction and evacuation saved countless lives, limiting the total fatalities to under 2,500 and total injuries to 27,500 people. The estimated number of injured and deceased individuals without the implementation of the evacuation skyrockets: estimating that over 150,000 people could have been injured without a successful evacuation. None of the precursors observed in this earthquake were observed in the 1976 Tangshan earthquake, which killed over 240,000.

1970 
After the occurrence of a number of large earthquakes from 1966–1969, a meeting was held nationally to discuss the where the largest seismic danger was in the People's Republic of China. These large earthquakes were determined to be moving to the North East, and it was also discussed that there would be a large earthquake of magnitude 5-6 at least along the Pohai Gulf. The prominent faults in the area determined to be the danger were the Jinzhou, Zhuanghe, and Yalu River faults, which were all prominent North-Northeast striking faults. There was then a large increase in scientific investigation in the surrounding province of Liaoning, as well as many new seismic stations, due to the long-range prediction.

June 1974 
After four years of data collection the meeting was brought back together to determine a new prediction. They believed that the magnitude 5–6 earthquake they had predicted in 1970 would now occur within the next 2 years in the northern part of the Pohai Gulf. Severely increased microearthquake activity as well as levelling and short level lines data assisted in the new prediction decision. The scientific examinations in the area were increased significantly and a large education campaign was initiated to inform the public on earthquake safety and the hazards of earthquakes.

December 1974 
There was a series of earthquakes in the area of Liaoyang, an area of usually low seismicity, the largest of which had a magnitude of 4.8. These quakes prompted the Revolutionary Committee of the Liaoning Province to issue alerts of a possible large earthquake in the near future. Reports of odd animal behavior and changes in ground water levels increased in the area into 1975.

Foreshocks
The prediction was further updated to be a magnitude 5.5–6 earthquake in the first half of 1975, likely due to the series of quakes at the end of 1974 as well as the observations of animals and groundwater. The foreshocks of the Haicheng earthquake then began on February 1, 1975 and continued into February 3. There were foreshocks of magnitudes greater than 4, which were felt throughout the province. The reports of odd behavior of water wells and animals began to migrate towards Haicheng at this time as well. Anomalies of radon emissions, electrical resistivity, and a tilt anomaly also occurred. All of this data led to the conclusion that the earthquake would occur within the next two days. Emergency measures were then taken to prevent loss of life.

Natural occurrences and earthquake prediction 
The study of declassified Chinese documents as well as interviews with witnesses have revealed the other occurrences considered by the People's Republic of China's National Earthquake Research Program when predicting the Haicheng earthquake. While these anomalies are not always indicators of a major earthquake to occur, they were all taken into account during the prediction of the Haicheng earthquake. These anomalies include ground surface deformation, changes in groundwater (including changes in level, color, and chemistry), and unusual animal behavior.

Ground surface deformation 
Ground surface deformation, also known as geodetic deformation, occurred both before and after the Haicheng earthquake. Dating back to decades before the earthquake, geodetic deformation was observed in the form of vertical crustal movements in a broad area around the general region of where the earthquake struck in 1975. The epicenter of the earthquake happened to fall where two of these steep vertical crusts intersect.

Another instance of ground surface deformation that was taken into account when predicting the earthquake was data recorded by the Jin Xian station 18 months before the quake occurred that was located only 200 kilometers from the epicenter of the earthquake. This data encompassed many stages of crustal deformation. This began with recording the initial, stable state, of the ground surface in the area. Tilting of the ground in one direction was then recorded, following by the recording of the ground tilting in the opposite direction. Stages of rapid to slow tilting were also observed. These data sets provided basis for intermediate and short-term predictions for the Haicheng earthquake.

Changes in groundwater 
Water wells which were monitored closely saw great fluctuations in their levels increasingly until the earthquake occurred in February 1975.

Unusual animal behavior 
Another sign of the earthquake coming was the unusual animal behavior. In December 1974, rats and snakes appeared "frozen" on the roads. Starting in February 1975 reports of this type increased greatly. Cows and horses looked restless and agitated. Rats appeared "drunk", chickens refused to enter their coops and geese frequently took to flight.

Earthquake prediction scrutiny 
In recent years, the success of the earthquake's prediction has come under scrutiny. Seismologists have agreed that the Haicheng earthquake can't be looked to as any sort of "prototype" for predicting future earthquakes, as the foreshocks that played a huge role in leading to prediction of this earthquake are not a regular, reliable occurrence before all earthquakes. However, Qi-Fu Chen, a research professor at Beijing's China Earthquake Administration, explained that this earthquake at least "showed the importance of public education," prompting a further discussion about the necessity of making the public aware of the dangers, preparations, and warning signs related to earthquakes.

It is still a topic of debate however whether there is any merit whatsoever of the prediction. Until recently, there were no details given of the evacuation which led to many scientist questioning the success of the prediction. The suspicion began were a lack of written records but increased due to the time period being during the cultural revolution, which was a period where gaining accurate information from China was extremely difficult.

This earthquake hit the nearby city of Tangshan and none of the foreshocks or other phenomena which were present before the Haicheng earthquake were observed prior to this incident. This second earthquake showed that the prediction of Haicheng's earthquake and subsequent evacuation was likely a fluke incident.

See also

List of earthquakes in 1975
List of earthquakes in China
Earthquake prediction

References

Further reading

External links
 

Earthquakes in China
Haicheng Earthquake, 1975
Haicheng, Liaoning
History of Liaoning
Haicheng
Haicheng earthquake
Haicheng earthquake